Christopher Carl Goodnow (born 19 September 1959) is an immunology researcher and the current Executive Director of the Garvan Institute of Medical Research. He holds the Bill and Patricia Ritchie Foundation Chair and is a Conjoint Professor in the Faculty of Medicine at UNSW Sydney. He holds dual Australian and US citizenship.

Career
Born in Hong Kong in 1959 to Robert Goodnow and Jacqueline J. Goodnow AC, Goodnow grew up in Rome and Washington DC before moving to Sydney, Australia as a teenager. He trained in veterinary medicine and surgery, immunochemistry and immunology at the University of Sydney and in DNA technology at Stanford University. After doctoral studies at Melbourne's Walter and Eliza Hall Institute of Medical Research and the University of Sydney, he joined the faculty of the Stanford University Medical School and the Howard Hughes Medical Institute in 1990. There he established the concept of multiple immune tolerance checkpoints, a framework now widely used in cancer treatment with "checkpoint inhibitors", and revealed the function of key genes in these checkpoints.

In 1997 Goodnow joined the faculty at the Australian National University as Professor and Founding Director of the Medical Genome Centre, leading its development into a major national research facility, the Australian Phenomics Facility. In 2015 he joined the Garvan Institute of Medical Research as Deputy Director to translate genomic DNA sequence analysis of the human immune system into understanding the cause of immune disorders and developing more effective, personalised treatments. During this period Goodnow oversaw the development of the Garvan-Weizmann Centre for Cellular Genomics in partnership with the Weizmann Institute of Science in Israel, the only multidisciplinary centre of its kind in the southern hemisphere as well as playing a key role in the development of the Clinical Immunogenomics Research Consortium Australia (CIRCA). In May 2018, Goodnow was named Executive Director of the Garvan Institute.

Academic History

1979-84: Training in Veterinary Medicine and Surgery, Faculty of Veterinary Science, University of Sydney

1983: B.Sc.Vet research, "Cellular and Molecular Studies of Kappa Myeloma Antigen", Clinical Immunology Research Centre, University of Sydney, with Dr. R.L. Raison

1984: Graduated, University of Sydney, B.V.Sc. Hons I, and B.Sc.(Vet) Hons I and University Medal

1985: Visiting Student and Research Assistant in the laboratory of Dr. Mark M. Davis, Dept. of Medical Microbiology, Stanford University Medical School

1985: National Health and Medical Research Council Biomedical Scholar, Ph.D. research, "A transgenic mouse model for self-tolerance in B lymphocytes", Walter and Eliza Hall Institute, with Professor Gustav JV Nossal

1986-89: NHMRC Biomedical Scholar, Ph.D. research, "A transgenic mouse model for self-tolerance in B lymphocytes", Clinical Immunology Research Centre, University of Sydney, with Associate Professor Ronald J. Trent and Professor Antony Basten

1989-90: Medical Foundation Postdoctoral Fellow, Clinical Immunology Research Centre, University of Sydney, with Professor Antony Basten

1990-97: Assistant Investigator, Howard Hughes Medical Institute & Assistant Professor of Microbiology and Immunology, Stanford University Medical School

1992-95: Searle Scholar

1997: Professor, Director of Medical Genome Centre, Australian Cancer Research Foundation Genetics Laboratory,
The John Curtin School of Medical Research, The Australian National University

2007-2014: Professor and Head of the Division of Genetics and Immunology, The John Curtin School of Medical Research, The Australian National University

2014–Present: Conjoint Professor, St Vincent's Clinical School, Faculty of Medicine, UNSW

Industry
Goodnow has served:
 On the scientific advisory board of Illumina, a genetic analysis technology company; and
 As founder and chief scientific officer for Phenomix Corp, a private biotechnology company.

Honours
 1979: John Gurner and Frederick Ebsworth Prize for Biology, University of Sydney
 1984: Honours Class I with B.V.Sc. degree; Honours Class I and University Medal with B.Sc.(Vet) degree
 1986: National Health and Medical Research Council Biomedical Research Scholarship
 1989: Medical Foundation Postdoctoral Fellowship
 1992-95: Searle Scholar
 1998: American Association of Immunologists/Pharmingen Investigator Award
 2001: Centenary Medal for services to Australian society and science in systems and control theory
 2001: Australian Academy of Science Gottschalk Medal
 2002: Elected a Fellow of the Australian Academy of Science
 2005: Australian Health Ministers Award for Excellence in Health and Medical Research
 2006: Australian Research Council Federation Fellow
 2006: American Association of Immunologists Distinguished Lecturer 
 2007: Ramaciotti Biomedical Research Award
 2009: Elected a Fellow of  The Royal Society, the UK and British Commonwealth academy of science (confirmed 2009-05-15)
 2010: Australasian Society for Immunology Burnet Orator
 2010: National Health and Medical Research Council of Australia Fellow
 2010: Ramaciotti Medal for Excellence in Biomedical Research
 2012: Glaxo-Smith-Kline Award for Research Excellence
 2013: Elected Member of the US National Academy of Sciences
 2015-2016: President of the Australasian Society for Immunology

Other interests 
Goodnow is well known for leading a 1980 expedition to Indonesia's remote Mentawai Islands off the coast of Sumatra, discovering the now-famous surf breaks and a wave that is today considered one of the world's best, Macaronis.

External
Biography - Australian National University
Australian Phenomics Facility

References

1959 births
Living people
Fellows of the Royal Society
Australian immunologists
Australian medical researchers
Academic staff of the Australian National University
WEHI alumni
Stanford University School of Medicine faculty
Howard Hughes Medical Investigators
Fellows of the Australian Academy of Science
Garvan Institute of Medical Research alumni